Isla Cuale, or Isla del Río Cuale, is a narrow island with art galleries and restaurants along Puerto Vallarta's Cuale River, in Zona Romántica, in the Mexican state of Jalisco.

La Iguana Bridge connects Centro to Zona Romántica via Isla Cuale. Puente Rio Cuale provides access to the island via the Malecón.

Features
River Cafe is a popular restaurant. Identidad (2019) and a statue of John Huston are installed on the island.

References

External links

 

Islands of Jalisco
Zona Romántica